The 163rd New York Infantry Regiment ( "3rd Regiment, Empire Brigade") was an infantry regiment in the Union Army during the American Civil War.

Service
The 163rd New York Infantry was organized at New York City, New York beginning July 11, 1862, and mustered in on October 10, 1862, in Washington, D.C., under the command of Lieutenant Colonel John B. Leverick.

The regiment was attached to Carroll's Brigade, Whipple's Division, Defenses of Washington, to November 1862. 2nd Brigade, 3rd Division, III Corps, Army of the Potomac, to January 1863.

The 163rd New York Infantry ceased to exist on January 20, 1863, when it was consolidated with the 73rd New York Volunteer Infantry.

Detailed service
Left New York for Washington October 5, 1862. Moved to Pleasant Valley, Maryland, October 18–19, 1862. Moved toward Warrenton, Virginia, October 24 – November 16. Moved to Falmouth November 18–24. Battle of Fredericksburg, Virginia, December 12–15, Duty at Falmouth, until January 20, 1863.

Casualties
The regiment lost a total of 26 men during service; 3 officers and 15 enlisted men killed or mortally wounded, 8 enlisted men died of disease.

Commanders
 Lieutenant Colonel John B. Leverick
 Major James J. Byrne – commanded at the Battle of Fredericksburg

See also

 List of New York Civil War regiments
 New York in the Civil War

References
 Dyer, Frederick H. A Compendium of the War of the Rebellion (Des Moines, IA: Dyer Pub. Co.), 1908.
Attribution
 

Military units and formations established in 1862
Military units and formations disestablished in 1863
Infantry 163